Pine Township is one of eleven townships in Benton County, Indiana. As of the 2020 census, its population was 324 and it contained 108 housing units. Pine Township was one of the original three created by county commissioners in July 1840, and is named for Big Pine Creek which flows south through the township.

Geography

Adjacent townships
 Bolivar (south)
 Center (west)
 Gilboa (north)
 Oak Grove (southwest)
 Union (northwest)
 Round Grove Township, White County (east)
 Shelby Township, Tippecanoe County (southeast)
 West Point Township, White County (northeast)

Major highways
  Indiana State Road 18

References
 United States Census Bureau cartographic boundary files
 U.S. Board on Geographic Names

External links

 Indiana Township Association
 United Township Association of Indiana

Townships in Benton County, Indiana
1840 establishments in Indiana
Populated places established in 1840
Townships in Indiana